Frederick Fontaine (14 December 1912 – 24 October 1982) was an Australian cricketer. He played six first-class cricket matches for Victoria between 1931 and 1932.

See also
 List of Victoria first-class cricketers

References

External links
 

1912 births
1982 deaths
Australian cricketers
Victoria cricketers
Cricketers from Melbourne